In 2021, Istat estimated that 5,171,894 foreign citizens lived in Italy, representing about 8.7% of the total population. These figures do not include naturalized foreign-born residents (about 1,620,000 foreigners acquired Italian citizenship from 1999 to 2020, of whom 130,000 did so in 2020) as well as illegal immigrants, the so-called clandestini, whose numbers, difficult to determine, are thought to be at least 670,000. 

In 2021, around 6,260,000 people residing in Italy have an immigration background (around the 10.6% of the total Italian population). 

Starting from the early 1980s, until then a linguistically and culturally homogeneous society, Italy begun to attract substantial flows of foreign immigrants. After the fall of the Berlin Wall and, more recently, the 2004 and 2007 enlargements of the European Union, large waves of migration originated from the former socialist countries of Eastern Europe (especially Romania, Albania, Ukraine, Moldova and Poland). Another source of immigration is neighbouring North Africa (in particular, Morocco, Egypt and Tunisia), with soaring arrivals as a consequence of the Arab Spring. Furthermore, in recent years, growing migration fluxes from Asia-Pacific (notably China and the Philippines) and Latin America have been recorded.

Since the expansion of the European Union, the most recent wave of migration has been from surrounding European states, particularly Eastern Europe, and increasingly Asia, replacing North Africa as the major immigration area. 

Romanians made up the largest foreign community in the country (1,077,876; around 10% of them being ethnic Romani people) followed by Albanians (433,130) and Moroccans (428,940). The fourth largest, but the fastest growing, community of foreign residents in Italy was represented by the Chinese; as of 2021 there were 330,495 foreigners holding Chinese citizenship. The majority of Chinese living in Italy are from the city of Wenzhou in the province of Zhejiang. As of 2021, foreign citizens' origins were subdivided as follows: Europe (47,6%), Africa (22.25%), Asia (22.64%), The Americas (7.49%), and Oceania (0.04%). 

The distribution of foreigners is largely uneven in Italy: in 2020, 61.2% of foreign citizens lived in Northern Italy (in particular 36.1% in the Northwest Italy and 25.1% in the Northeast Italy), 24.2% in the Central Italy, 10.8% in the South Italy and 3.9% in the Insular Italy. 

The children born in Italy to foreign mothers were 102,000 in 2012, 99,000 in 2013 and 97,000 in 2014.

Statistics

On foreigners only, for more information dealing with foreigners who have subsequently acquired Italian citizenship refer to Eurostat site.

Prison population 
According to the Ministry of Justice, the Italian prison population in 2019 counted 60,769 and of those 32.7% were foreigners. The largest groups came from Morocco (3,651), Albania (2,402), Romania (2,386), Tunisia (2,020), Nigeria (1,665).

Amongst national origins counting more than 5,000 individuals at national level, Algeria, followed by Gambia and Tunisia, had the biggest proportion of detainees (with, respectively, 25.8, 23.7 and 20.7 inmates per 1,000 residents). On the other hand, Japan, Thailand and the Philippines had the lowest proportion of inmates per 1,000 residents (respectively, 0.13, and 0.50 for both Thailand and the Philippines).

Public opinion 

In 2018, a poll by Pew Research found that a majority (71%) wanted fewer immigrants to be allowed into the country, 18% wanted to keep the current level and 5% wanted to increase immigration.

A 2019 poll by Yougov showed that 53% thought authorities should not accept more refugees from conflict areas, 25% were in favour of more refugees and 19% were undecided.

According to poll published by Corriere della Sera in 2019, one of two respondents (51%) approved closing Italy's ports to further boat migrants arriving via the Mediterranean, while 19% welcomed further boat migrants.

In 2021, 77% of Italians thought the current immigrant influx was too high, as underlined by a poll published by La Repubblica and carried out by YouGov.

2000s Mediterranean Sea crossings crisis

Due to the peninsula geographical position and close proximity to the North Africa coast, the crossing of the Mediterranean Sea has historically been the most used route for undocumented migrants. This route has become gradually more prominent, as flow through other routes to the EU gradually faded and political turmoil in Libya caused a general weakening of borders and coastal control, opening opportunities to people smuggling organisations.

The principal destination for sea crossings boats and rafts are the southernmost Italian territories, the Pelagie Islands. These islands are 113 km from Tunisia, 167 from Libya and 207 from Sicily.

The close distance between these islands and the African mainland has caused people smuggling organisations to employ boats and rafts otherwise hardly seaworthy, generally vastly filled above their capacity. Official reports list boats filled up to 2 or 3 times nominal capacity, including the use of rubber dinghies. This has led to several accidents at sea, as in 2007, the 2009, the 2011, the 2013, 2015. These accidents have become harder to document between 2014 and 2017, as people smuggling organisations changed their tactics: instead of aiming for a full crossing of the sea towards Lampedusa, their boats aimed just to exit Libyan territorial waters and then trigger rescue operation from passing mercantile vessels, seek and rescue organisations, Italian and Maltese coastguards and militaries. As per the United Nations Convention of the Sea, of which Italy is a subscriber, people rescued at sea have to be transported to the closest safe harbor: as Libya continues to be in political turmoil this means they are transported to Italy.

Once in Italy, the EU Dublin Regulation requires migrants to apply for legal residence, protection or asylum permits in the first EU country they cross into, effectively barring them from legally crossing internal EU borders until their case has been processed and positively concluded. As the vast majority of migrant people landing in Italy targets destinations in Central and Northern European States, there is a tendency to avoid filing permits applications in Italy and rather try a northwards land journey.

As a reaction to the gradual increase in migration flows through the Mediterranean Sea, Italian governments stepped up cooperation with Tunisian and Libyan authorities to halt activities of people smuggling organisation on land, as well as to allow boats rescued from the Italian Military in international waters to be towed back to the port where they left from. This policy, enacted in 2004 and 2005, sparked controversies related in particular to the compatibility with Italian and EU laws, as numerous reports documented acts of violence from Libyan authorities on migrant people. The policy was openly criticised by the EU Parliament.

In 2008, Berlusconi’s government in Italy and Gaddafi’s government in Libya signed a treaty including cooperation between the two countries in stopping unlawful migration from Libya to Italy; this led to a policy of forcibly returning to Libya boat migrants intercepted by the Italian coast guard at sea. The cooperation collapsed following the outbreak of the Libyan civil war in 2011. In 2012 the European Court of Human Rights ruled that Italy had violated the European Convention on Human Rights by returning migrants to Libya, as it exposed the migrants to the risk of being subjected to ill-treatment in Libya and violated the prohibition of collective expulsions., thus effectively ending the policy.

In 2009, as the flow of migrants picked up again, the overcrowded conditions at the Pelagie Islands' temporary immigrant reception centre came under criticism by the United Nations High Commissioner for Refugees (UNHCR). The unit, which was originally built for a maximum capacity of 850 people, was reported to be housing nearly 2,000 boat people. A significant number of people were sleeping outdoors under plastic sheeting. A fire started as an inmate riot destroyed a large portion of the holding facility on 19 February 2009.

In 2011, as Arab Spring rebellions in Tunisia and Libya disrupted government control over borders and coasts, by May 2011, more than 35,000 immigrants had arrived on the island of Lampedusa from Tunisia and Libya. By the end of August, 48,000 had arrived. 
As migration and asylum policies are exclusive responsibilities of each member State, the increased migration pressure at the EU Southern border sparked tensions between EU States on how to differentiate between people migrating due to economic reasons, which in principle are regarded as unlawful immigrants and thus are forced to leave or deported, and people fleeing violence or persecution for religious, sexual orientation, political reasons, who can be granted asylum rights. As the Libyan authoritarian governments struggled to keep control of the country, it allowed an increase in northbound migrant flows as a tactic to pressure Italy and the EU not to militarily intervene in the country, as Gaddafi feared his regime would be overthrown.

Some Italian towns and cities disobeyed instructions from the national government to house migrants. The Mafia Capitale investigation revealed that the Italian Mafia profited from the migrant crisis and exploited refugees. The murder of Ashley Ann Olsen in her Italian apartment by an illegal immigrant from Senegal rapidly acquired political significance in the context of the European migrant crisis. The police chief of Florence addressed safety concerns and "assur[ed] the public that Florence remained safe" in the wake of the Olsen murder.

Since 2014, thousands of migrants have tried every month to cross the Central Mediterranean to Italy, risking their lives on unsafe boats including fishing trawlers. Many of them were fleeing poverty-stricken homelands or war-torn countries and sought economic opportunity within the EU. Italy, and, in particular, its southern island of Lampedusa, received enormous numbers of Africans and Middle-Easterners transported by smugglers and NGOs operating along the ungoverned coast of the failed state of Libya.

There were 153,842 Mediterranean sea arrivals to Italy in 2015, 9 percent less than the previous year; most of the refugees and migrants came from Eritrea, Nigeria, and Somalia, whereas the number of Syrian refugees sharply decreased, as most of them took the Eastern Mediterranean route from Turkey to Greece.

The first three months of 2016 saw an increase in the number of migrants rescued at sea being brought to southern Italian ports. In April 2016, nearly 6,000 mostly sub-Saharan African migrants landed in Italy in four days. In June 2016, over 10,000 migrants were rescued in four days. In 2016, 181,100 migrants arrived in Italy by sea.

In April 2017, more than 8,000 migrants were rescued near Libya and brought to Italy in three days. From January to November 2017, approximately 114,600 migrants arrived in Italy by sea. Approximately 5,000 African migrants were rescued in waters off the coast of Libya between 18–20 May 2017.

Since 2013, Italy took in over 700,000 migrants, mainly from sub-Saharan Africa.

Controversies regarding NGOs
After 2015, as an increased use of unseaworthy vessels by people smuggling organisations caused a marked increase in accidents at sea involving loss of lives, several European NGOs have started seek and rescue operations in close coordination with Italian Navy and coast guard units. These operations often happen close to Libyan territorial waters at the same time in order not to unlawfully enter Libyan jurisdictions and yet ensure migrants' safety. As per UNCLOS, rescued people are brought to the closer safe harbor, which is in most cases on Italian shore. This effectively means NGOs vessels are covering most of the distance between Libyan and Italian coast.
Right-wing Italian newspapers and activists picked on that to make various claims, among which that NGOs active in migrants' assistance and rescue at sea would reap financial profits from their collaboration with the Italian authorities, or that some NGOs are part of unlawful people smuggling operations in coordination with operatives on Libyan coast, and funded by international criminal groups and financial institutions interested in developing political turmoil in Italy.
The Italian Parliament investigated these claims and has found them to be unsubstantiated, with no further actions. Regardless of this, right-wing newspapers have continued campaigning against Italian and foreign NGOs.

In August 2017 the ship "Iuventa" operated by the German NGO "Jugend Rettet" (youth to the rescue) was impounded on the island of Lampedusa on the order of an Italian prosecutor on suspicion of facilitating illegal immigration. Jugend Rettet is one of the six out of nine NGOs which refused to sign a new code of conduct by the Italian government covering migrant rescues in the Mediterranean. The prosecutor alleged that there were "contacts, meetings and understandings" between the boat's crew and the smugglers. No crew members from the "Iuventa" had been charged and the prosecutor admitted that their motive was likely humanitarian. (Five out of eight refused to sign the new code of conduct, according to a Guardian article, the others refusing to sign being MSF, the Germany groups Sea-Watch, Sea-Eye and Jugend Rettet, and France's SOS Mediterranée '[all of whom] abstained'. 'MSF, SOS Mediterranée and Jugend Rettet... called for clarification of the rules' while MOAS and Spanish group Proactiva Open Arms agreed to the conditions, and Save the Children 'backed the measures'.)

The Conte I Cabinet, influenced by hard-line Interior Minister Matteo Salvini, refused to let migrant ships dock in its waters. On 10 June 2018, Salvini announced the closure of Italian ports, stating that "Everyone in Europe is doing their own business, now Italy is also raising its head. Let's stop the business of illegal immigration." The vessel Aquarius, which is operated jointly by Médecins Sans Frontières and SOS Méditerranée and carried more than 600 migrants, was refused a port of disembarkation by the Italian authorities despite having been told to rescue the migrants by the same co-ordination centre. The Italian authority told the vessel to ask Malta to provide a disembarkation port, but Malta has also refused. On the following day, the new Spanish Prime Minister Pedro Sánchez accepted the disputed migrant ship. On 12 June 2019, the Sea Watch 3 ship picked up 53 migrants in the Mediterranean off the Libyan coast. Sea Watch 3 rejected an offer to dock at Tripoli, which is considered unsafe by humanitarian organizations, and headed toward Lampedusa. According to a report by the Süddeutsche Zeitung and NGOs this was the nearest safe harbor per maritime law. On 14 June, Italy closed its ports to migrant rescue ships. Salvini refused to allow the ship to dock until other European nations had agreed to take the migrants. Ten of the migrants, including children, pregnant women, and those who were ill, were allowed to disembark. On 29 June, without authorization, ship's captain Carola Rackete decided to dock. The motivation for this was that according to her the passengers were exhausted. Rackete was arrested by the Italian authorities after docking. Matteo Salvini accused Rackete of trying to sink an Italian patrol boat that was attempting to intercept her, calling the incident an act of war and demanding the Netherlands government intervention. However, on 2 July, Rackete was released from house arrest after a court ruling that she had broken no laws and acted to protect passengers' safety.

In August 2019, Salvini announced a motion of no confidence against Prime Minister Conte, after growing tensions within the majority. Salvini's alleged gambit failed, as Conte successfully negotiated the formation of a new cabinet with centre-left Democratic Party, which completely changed the immigration policy of the previous government, returning to receive NGO ships in Italian ports.

Italian naval mission to Libyan waters 
On 2 August 2017 Italy's parliament authorized a limited naval mission to Libyan waters aimed at supporting the country's coastguard in the fight against illegal migration. Italy sent two patrol boats at the request of the UN-backed government in Tripoli and insisted it had no intention of violating Libyan sovereignty. However, General Khalifa Haftar, who controls most of eastern Libya, threatened to use his own forces to repel the Italians.

See also

Immigration detention in Italy
2015 Mediterranean migration crisis
List of countries by foreign-born population
Movies about immigration to Italy
Lampedusa immigrant reception center

Notes

References

Further reading
 Cusumano, Eugenio, and Kristof Gombeer. "In deep waters: The legal, humanitarian and political implications of closing Italian ports to migrant rescuers." Mediterranean Politics 25.2 (2020): 245-253. online

 
Demographics of Italy